Spahr is a German surname of:

 Friedrich Wilhelm Spahr (1900 – 1945), German artisan for Silver overlay on porcelain and glass
 Charles Barzillai Spahr (1860-1904), American political economist
 Charles "Charlie" E. Spahr (1913, Kansas City – 2009, Shaker Heights, Ohio)
  (1913, Konstanz – 1986, Weingarten/Württemberg), German Benedictine monk, historian, art historian
 Jean Gurney Fine Spahr (1861-1935), American social reformer
 Juliana Spahr (born 1966, Chillicothe, Ohio), American poet, critic, and editor
 Samuel Spahr Laws (1824 – 1921), American physician, businessman, inventor, professor, college president and minister
 Timothy B. Spahr, American astronomer
 171P/Spahr, periodic comet in the Solar System; named after Timothy B. Spahr
 
 2975 Spahr, main-belt asteroid; named after Timothy B. Spahr

See also 
 Ballard Spahr LLP, American law firm established in 1885 in Philadelphia, named after Ivar Ballard

German-language surnames